Anthony Chapman is a British drummer and songwriter who was especially active during the 1960s. He gained valuable drumming experience as part of the Cliftons in 1960, then jammed with an early line-up of the Rolling Stones before they settled on their permanent band members. He appeared with the band in 1962, including a performance at Sidcup Art College, Bexley, which Keith Richards had attended, and was reputedly the drummer at the first official performance of the group, on 12 July 1962 at the Marquee Club in London yet Chapman himself, later cast doubt that he had appeared at the Marquee.

Chapman was the person through whom Bill Wyman was enlisted to the Stones, having been in Wyman's band The Cliftons. It was Chapman who made inquiries about vacancies with the Stones and discovered they might be found at the Wetherby Arms on the King's Road, Chelsea. He and Wyman turned up for a run-through and although they had doubts about the blues style and did not like the name, agreed to join. Another drummer, Steve Harris, also sat in for some sessions – Charlie Watts was still with Alexis Korner. Chapman felt that he did not fit in with the way-out approach, of the group for the time and left to play drums for the Alphabeats before leaving to form a band called The Preachers. Wyman remained to join the Rolling Stones, when Watts took over as their permanent drummer.

Chapman's group, the Preachers had a less wild approach and he wrote one side of their only single "Too Old In The Head" the flip side of "Hole In The Soul." The Preachers was one of the first bands that 14 year old Peter Frampton appeared in and was being produced and managed by Bill Wyman. Chapman was responsible for the first meeting between Wyman and Frampton in 1964. The Preachers disbanded for a time following a fatal van crash on the 4 June 1964, Chapman temporarily lost his memory and had no recollection of the collision, when the vehicle left the road and hit a telegraph pole. Chapman (joined Peter Frampton) and tried out for the drums in The Herd but he was eased out as a member in 1965, when they recruited Andrew Steele, Andy Bown (later of Status Quo) and others. 

Chapman reformed the Preachers in June 1965, with Peter Frampton, Pete Astwood, Ken Leaton and Peter Gosling, releasing a single on Columbia soon after (1965) produced by Bill Wyman, Chapman wrote the B side, Too Old In The Head. They opened for the Rolling Stones on ITV's Ready Steady Go! on 2 September 1965 and regularly performed on the circuit, until a year later when they split up.

Chapman stepped away from the music business and moved to Palm Springs, Florida in the United States soon after. He built up a Fine Art business, which he sold in 2011, when he retired, he moved to Portugal to play Golf.

References

British male drummers
British rhythm and blues boom musicians
Possibly living people
The Rolling Stones members
The Herd (British band) members
Year of birth missing